Myrskylä is a municipality of Finland. Neighbouring municipalities are Askola, Porvoo, Pukkila, Orimattila, Lapinjärvi and Loviisa.

The Myrskylä parish was founded in 1636 when it was separated from Pernaja by Isaacus Rothovius, the Bishop of Turku, and confirmed by Christina, the Queen of Sweden.

Geography
There are many lakes connected to the Myrskylänjoki watershed. These lakes are Pöyrysjärvi, Isojärvi, Vähäjärvi, Muttilanjärvi, Siippo, Sopajärvi, Kirkkojärvi and Sulkavanjärvi.

Villages
Hallila, Hyövinkylä, Jaakkola, Kankkila, Myrskylä (Kirkonkylä), Pakila and Kreivilä.

History 
The area was originally a part of the Pernaja parish and has had both Finnish and Swedish inhabitants since the medieval times. The village of Hallila (under its Swedish name Skomarböle) was first mentioned in 1403 while Myrskylä itself was first mentioned in 1485. The name of Myrskylä comes from the Finnish word myrsky meaning "storm", likely via a farm name.

Myrskylä acquired its first church in 1604 or 1611, eventually becoming its own parish in 1636. The parish was an annex of the bishop of Porvoo from 1747 to 1865.

Demographics

The municipality is bilingual, with majority being Finnish and minority Swedish speakers.

Myrskylä is the birthplace of former Olympic track champion Lasse Virén. The educational department takes part in Lifelong Learning Programme 2007–2013 in Finland.

Politics
Results of the 2011 Finnish parliamentary election in Myrskylä:

True Finns   27.1%
Centre Party   22.0%
National Coalition Party   15.7%
Social Democratic Party   12.6%
Swedish People's Party   10.0%
Green League   4.6%
Christian Democrats   3.7%
Left Alliance   2.8%

References

External links

 Municipality of Myrskylä – Official website, Finnish, Swedish

 
Populated places established in 1636
1636 establishments in Sweden